Gary Callander (5 July 1959 – 5 December 2021) was a Scottish international rugby union player who made six international appearances for the Scotland national team between 1984 and 1988. He played in the Hooker position. He coached Haddington, Gala, Watsonians and Kelso.

Rugby Union career

Amateur career

Callander began his rugby career playing for Kelso at the age of 16; and at the age of 18 collected his first coveted Melrose Sevens winner's medals.

While captain of Kelso Rugby Club (1984–85 and 1987–88) he led the team to become Border League winners in 1984–85 and to then win the Division 1 Championships in 1987–88.

He won the Melrose Sevens five times in total.

His Sevens career also took him twice to the final of the Hong Kong Sevens Cup competition, playing for the Co-Optimists and the Scottish Borderers.

Provincial career

Callander played for South of Scotland District. He was part of the squad that won the Scottish Inter-District Championship in 1984–85 season.

He played for Combined Scottish Districts on 1 March 1986 against South of Scotland and captained the side.

International career

Callander was capped by Scotland 'B' in 1982 to play against France 'B'.

He won six caps playing hooker for the Scotland national team between 1984 and 1988. He was captain of the Scottish team for five matches, including a 24–11 win over France at Murrayfield Stadium in 1988.

In 1985 a knee injury led to him missing the 1985 Scotland rugby union tour of North America. In 1986 he captained Scotland for a tour of France and Spain during which Scotland won two out of five matches and drew one.

Coaching career

Callander coached at Haddington from 1990.

In 1993, together with Simon Scott, he began coaching the Scottish students team.

He has successfully coached a wide range of teams across Scotland between 1991 and 2007 including Gala, Watsonians and Kelso. He joined Watsonians in 2001 and left in 2004.

He later offered help to Merchiston Castle School in Edinburgh.

Personal life

Callander died from pancreatic cancer in Melrose, on 5 December 2021, at the age of 62.

References

External links

profile on ESPN
profile on www.sporting-heroes.net

1959 births
2021 deaths
Scottish rugby union players
Scottish rugby union coaches
Rugby union players from Kelso
Scotland international rugby union players
Kelso RFC players
Scotland 'B' international rugby union players
Co-Optimist Rugby Club players
South of Scotland District (rugby union) players
Rugby union hookers
Deaths from pancreatic cancer
Deaths from cancer in Scotland
Scottish Districts (combined) players